The Essex flag is the flag of the English county of Essex. The flag of Essex is ancient in origin and features three notched Saxon seaxes (cutlasses) on a red field.

The earliest references to the flag being used to represent the county date back to the 17th century. A Restitution of Decayed Intelligence, written in 1605 by Richard Verstegan, referred to the Anglo-Saxons bearing a standard of "Three seaxes argent, in a field gules". Similarly, cartographer John Speed included the flag in his 1611 atlas The Theatre of the Empire of Great Britaine. 

Sir Winston Churchill also included the three seaxes as being representative of Essex in his 1675 work Divi Britannici. As a result of this, the symbol was installed on a stained glass window in Westminster Abbey in 1735.

By 1815 the flag had become synonymous with the county, appearing as the masthead on the Chelmsford Chronicle and as the logo of the Essex and Suffolk Equitable Insurance Society.

By the late 19th and early 20th centuries, the flag saw widespread usage throughout the county, appearing on buildings and infrastructure in numerous settlements.

In 1889, Essex County Council adopted the flag as its own symbol.

The Flag Institute formally recognised the flag's relationship with the county in the early 21st century.

On 26 October 2014, the flag of Essex flew outside the Department for Communities and Local Government in order to mark Essex Day. The day was chosen in order to mark the feast of Saint Cedd.



Flag design
The Pantone colours for the flag are:
Red 485
White
Yellow 116

References

External links
[ Flag Institute registration particulars]

Essex
Essex
Flags introduced in 1889